29 Flat Rock Road is a historic house in Branford, Connecticut.  Probably built in the late 18th century, it is a well-preserved example of a modest period farmhouse, a type of which relatively few now survive in the town.  It was listed on the National Register of Historic Places in 1988.

Description and history
Flat Rock Road is a rural-residential road in eastern Branford, Number 29 is located on the south side, a short way east of its western junction with Leetes Island Road.  It is a -story wood-frame structure, with a side-gable roof, central chimney, and clapboarded exterior.  The roof does not project beyond the front facade, and the slender brick chimney is probably not original.  The main facade is five bays wide, with windows arranged symmetrically around the center entrance.  The entrance is a four-panel door, framed by wide moulding which is topped by a projecting cornice.

The house's early construction history is not known with certainty.  Long referred to as the "24 acre homestead" in 19th-century records, it was owned at that time first by Reuben Frisbie and then by members of the Tucker family.  Earlier owners are not identified; land records suggest it was built in the 1790s.  It is one of only few modest vernacular farmhouses from the 18th century still standing in Branford.

See also
National Register of Historic Places listings in New Haven County, Connecticut

References

National Register of Historic Places in New Haven County, Connecticut
Houses on the National Register of Historic Places in Connecticut
Colonial architecture in the United States
Houses completed in 1750
Houses in Branford, Connecticut